Karen Autio is a Finnish Canadian writer of children's fiction. She has written a historical novel trilogy about a young immigrant girl Saara Mäki and her adventures in 1910s Canada.

Karen Autio was born in Fort William, Ontario and grew up in the area, now called Thunder Bay. She lives currently in Kelowna, British Columbia. She studied mathematics and computer science at the University of Waterloo and worked as a software developer before starting her writing career.

Her first novel, Second Watch (Sonoris Press 2005), is set around the wreck of the RMS Empress of Ireland in 1914. Young Saara is one of the few surviving children in the disaster that took more than 1,000 lives. In the sequel, Saara's Passage (2008), Saara takes care of her mother who is treated for tuberculosis. In Sabotage (2013), Saara and her younger brother Jussi grow up in Port Arthur, Ontario, during the First World War.

Works
Second Watch (2005), 
Saara's Passage (2008), 
Sabotage (2013), 
Kah-Lan the Adventurous Sea Otter (2015),

References

External links

Karen Autio’s website

Living people
Canadian children's writers
Canadian people of Finnish descent
Canadian women children's writers
People from Kelowna
Writers from British Columbia
Writers from Thunder Bay
University of Waterloo alumni
Year of birth missing (living people)